Karnaveh-ye Shirin (also Romanized as Karnāveh-ye Shīrīn; also known as Karnāveh-ye Shīrān) is a village in Hezarmasjed Rural District, in the Central District of Kalat County, Razavi Khorasan Province, Iran. At the 2006 census, its population was 471, in 94 families.

References 

Populated places in Kalat County